The Chief of Defence Force is the highest-ranking military officer of in the Maldives National Defence Force, who is responsible for maintaining the operational command of the military.

List of chiefs

References

Military of the Maldives
Maldives